Alejandro Villanueva (1908–1944) was a Peruvian footballer.

Alejandro Villanueva may also refer to:

Estadio Alejandro Villanueva, stadium in Peru
Alejandro Villanueva (American football) (born 1988)
Alejandro "Alex" Villanueva (born 1963), 33rd sheriff of Los Angeles County